is a 1958 Japanese drama film written and directed by Kaneto Shindo.

Cast
 Kinuyo Tanaka as Hideyo
 Machiko Kyō as Michiko
 Jūkichi Uno as Kishimoto
 Eiji Funakoshi as Hiroshi
 Reiko Hibiki as Toshi
 Kazuko Ichikawa as Yoshiko
 Naoyasu Itō as Clerk
 Toshiko Kagiyama as Yuri
 Natsuko Kaji as Sakie
 Bontarō Miake as Yasuzō
 Mitsuko Mito as Harue

References

External links
 

1958 films
Japanese drama films
1950s Japanese-language films
1958 drama films
Films directed by Kaneto Shindo
Japanese black-and-white films
1950s Japanese films